A suicide method is any means by which a person may choose to end their lives. Suicide attempts do not always result in death, and a non-fatal suicide attempt can leave the person with serious physical injuries, long-term health problems, and brain damage.

Worldwide, three suicide methods predominate with the pattern varying in different countries. These are hanging, poisoning by pesticides, and firearms.

Some suicides are impulse decisions that may be preventable by removing the means. Making common suicide methods less accessible leads to an overall reduction in the number of suicides. Some ways to do this include restricting access to pesticides, firearms, and known-used drugs. Other important measures are the introduction of policies that address the misuse of alcohol and the treatment of mental disorders. Gun-control measures in a number of countries have seen a reduction in suicides and other gun-related deaths.

Purpose of study 
The study of suicide methods aims to identify those commonly used, and the groups at risk of suicide; making methods less accessible may be useful in suicide prevention. Limiting the availability of means such as pesticides and firearms is recommended by a World Health Report on suicide and its prevention. The early identification of mental disorders and substance abuse disorders, follow-up care for those who have attempted suicide, and responsible reporting by the media are all seen to be key in reducing the number of deaths by suicide. National suicide prevention strategies are also advocated using a comprehensive and coordinated response to suicide prevention. This needs to include the registration and monitoring of suicides and attempted suicide, breaking figures down by age, sex, and method.

Such information allows public health resources to focus on the problems that are relevant in a particular place, or for a given population or subpopulation. For instance, if firearms are used in a significant number of suicides in one place, then public health policies there could focus on gun safety, such as keeping guns locked away, and the key inaccessible to at-risk family members. If young people are found to be at increased risk of suicide by overdosing on particular medications, then an alternative class of medication may be prescribed instead, a safety plan and monitoring of medication can be put in place, and parents can be educated about how to prevent the hoarding of medication for a future suicide attempt.

Media reporting 
Media reporting of the methods used in suicides is "strongly discouraged" by the World Health Organization, government health agencies, universities, and the Associated Press among others. Detailed descriptions of suicides or the personal characteristics of the person who died contribute to copycat suicides (suicide contagion). Dramatic or inappropriate descriptions of individual suicides by mass media has been linked specifically to copycat suicides among teenagers. Writing for the New Yorker about celebrity suicides, Andrew Solomon wrote that "You who are reading this are at statistically increased risk of suicide right now." In one study, changes in how news outlets reported suicide reduced suicides by a particular method.

Media reporting guidelines also apply to "online content including citizen-generated media coverage". The Recommendations for Reporting on Suicide, created by journalists, suicide prevention groups, and internet safety non-profit organizations, encourage linking to resources such as a list of suicide crisis lines and information about risk factors for suicide, and reporting on suicide as a multi-faceted, treatable health issue.

Method restriction 

Method restriction, also called lethal means reduction, is an effective way to reduce the number of suicide deaths in the short and medium term. Method restriction is considered a best practice supported by "compelling" evidence. Some of these actions, such as installing barriers on bridges and reducing the toxicity in gas, require action by governments, industries, or public utilities. At the individual level, method restriction can be as simple as asking a trusted friend or family member to store firearms until the crisis has passed. According to Danuta Wasserman, professor in psychiatry and suicidology at Karolinska Institute, choosing not to restrict access to suicide methods is unethical.

Method restriction is effective and prevents suicides. It has the largest effect on overall suicide rates when the method being restricted is common and no direct substitution is available. If the method being restricted is uncommon, or if a substitute is readily available, then it may be effective in individual cases but not produce a large-scale reduction in the number of deaths in a country.

Method substitution is the process of choosing a different suicide method when the first-choice method is inaccessible. In many cases, when the first-choice method is restricted, the person does not attempt to find a substitute. Method substitution has been measured over the course of decades, so when a common method is restricted (for example, by making domestic gas less toxic), overall suicide rates may be suppressed for many years. If the first-choice suicide method is inaccessible, a method substitution may be made which may be less lethal, tending to result in fewer fatal suicide attempts.

In an example of the curb cut effect, changes unrelated to suicide have also functioned as suicide method restrictions. Examples of this include changes to align train doors with platforms, switching from coal gas to natural gas in homes, and gun control laws, all of which have reduced suicides despite being intended for a different purpose.

List

Suffocation 
Suffocation, as a classification of suicide method, includes strangulation and hanging.

Suicide by suffocation involves restricting breathing or the amount of oxygen taken in, causing asphyxia and eventually hypoxia. It is not possible to die simply by holding the breath, since a reflex causes the respiratory muscles to contract, forcing an in-breath, and the re-establishment of a normal breathing rhythm. Therefore, inhaling an inert gas such as helium or nitrogen, or a toxic gas such as carbon monoxide, is used to bring about unconsciousness. , organizations supporting a right to die promoted death by helium inhalation, although most cases using this method in the US were people with psychiatric conditions.

Hanging 

Hanging is a common method of suicide. Hanging involves the use of a ligature such as a rope or cord attached to an anchor point with the other end used to form a noose placed around the neck. The cause of death will either be due to strangulation or a broken neck. About half of attempted suicides by hanging result in death. People who favor this method are usually unaware that it is often a "slow, painful, and messy method that [needs] technical knowledge".

Hanging is the prevalent means of suicide in impoverished pre-industrial societies, and is more common in rural areas than in urban areas.

Hanging was the most common method in traditional Chinese culture, as it was believed that the rage involved in such a death permitted the person's spirit to haunt and torment survivors. In the Chinese culture, suicide by hanging was used as an act of revenge by women and of defiance by powerless officials, who used it as a "final, but unequivocal, way of standing still against and above oppressive authorities". Chinese people would often approach the act ceremonially, including the use of proper attire.

Poisoning 
Suicide by poisoning, also called self-poisoning, is usually classed as a drug overdose when drugs such as painkillers or recreational drugs are used. The use of pesticides to self-poison is the most common method used in some countries. Poisoning through the means of toxic plants is usually slow and painful.

Pesticide 

, worldwide, around 30% of suicides were from pesticide poisonings. The use of this method varies markedly in different areas of the world, from 0.9% in Europe to about 50% in the Pacific region. In the US, pesticide poisoning is used in about 12 suicides per year.

Method restriction has been an effective way to reduce suicide by poisoning in many countries. In Finland, limiting access to parathion in the 1960s resulted in a rapid decline in both poisoning-related suicides and total suicide deaths for several years, and a slower decline in subsequent years. In Sri Lanka, both suicide by pesticide and total suicides declined after first toxicity class I and later class II endosulfan were banned. Overall suicide deaths were cut by 70%, with 93,000 lives saved over 20 years as a result of banning these pesticides. In Korea, banning a single pesticide, paraquat, halved the number of suicides by pesticide poisoning and reduced the total number of suicides in that country.

Drug overdose 

A drug overdose involves taking a dose of a drug that exceeds safe levels. In the UK (England and Wales) until 2013, a drug overdose was the most common suicide method in females. In 2019 in males the percentage is 16%. Self-poisoning accounts for the highest number of non-fatal suicide attempts. Overdose attempts using painkillers are among the most common, due to their easy availability over-the-counter. Paracetamol is the most widely used analgesic worldwide and is commonly used in overdose attempts. Paracetamol poisoning is a common cause of acute liver failure. In the United States about 60% of suicide attempts and 14% of suicide deaths involve drug overdoses. The risk of death in suicide attempts involving overdose is about 2%.

Carbon monoxide 

A particular type of poisoning involves the inhalation of high levels of carbon monoxide (CO). Death usually occurs through hypoxia. A nonfatal attempt can result in memory loss and other symptoms.

Carbon monoxide is a colorless and odorless gas, so its presence cannot be detected by sight or smell. It acts by binding preferentially to the hemoglobin in the bloodstream, displacing oxygen molecules and progressively deoxygenating the blood, eventually resulting in the failure of cellular respiration and death. Carbon monoxide is extremely dangerous to bystanders and people who may discover the body; right-to-die advocate Philip Nitschke has therefore recommended against this method.

Before air quality regulations and catalytic converters, suicide by carbon monoxide poisoning was often achieved by running a car's engine in an enclosed space such as a garage, or by redirecting a running car's exhaust back inside the cabin with a hose. Motor car exhaust may have contained up to 25% carbon monoxide. Catalytic converters found on all modern automobiles eliminate over 99% of carbon monoxide produced. As a further complication, the amount of unburned gasoline in emissions can make exhaust unbearable to breathe well before a person loses consciousness.

Charcoal-burning suicide induces death from carbon monoxide poisoning. Originally used in Hong Kong, it spread to Japan, where small charcoal-burning heaters (hibachi) or stoves (shichirin) have been used in a sealed room. By 2001, this method accounted for 25% of deaths from suicide in Japan. Nonfatal attempts can result in severe brain damage due to cerebral anoxia.

Other toxins 

Gas-oven suicide was a common method of suicide in the early to mid-20th centuries in some North American and European countries. Household gas was originally coal gas, also called illuminating gas, or town gas, which was composed of methane, hydrogen and carbon monoxide. Stoves of this era required one to manually ignite a pilot light with a match; without the combustion the gas cloud would spread unimpeded. Carbon monoxide poisoning was the proximate cause of death. Natural gas, introduced in the 1960s, is composed of methane, ethane and an odorant added for safety. The suicide rates by domestic gas fell from 1960 to 1980, as changes were made to the formula to make it less lethal.

Shooting 

In the United States suicide by firearm is the most lethal method of suicide, resulting in a fatality 90% of the time, and is thus the leading cause of death by suicide as of 2017. Worldwide, firearm prevalence in suicides varies widely, depending on the acceptance and availability of firearms in a culture. The use of firearms in suicides ranges from less than 10% in Australia to 50.5% in the U.S., where it is the most common method of suicide.

Generally, the bullet will be aimed at point-blank range. Surviving a self-inflicted gunshot may result in severe chronic pain as well as reduced cognitive abilities and motor function, subdural hematoma, foreign bodies in the head, pneumocephalus and cerebrospinal fluid leaks. For temporal bone directed bullets, temporal lobe abscess, meningitis, aphasia, hemianopsia, and hemiplegia are common late intracranial complications. As many as 50% of people who survive gunshot wounds directed at the temporal bone suffer facial nerve damage, usually due to a severed nerve.

Gun control 

Reducing access to guns at a population level decreases the risk of suicide by firearms. 

Fewer people die from suicide overall in places with stricter laws regulating the use, purchase, and trading of firearms. Suicide risk goes up when firearms are more available.

Gun control is a primary method of reducing suicide by people who live in a home with guns. Prevention measures include simple actions such as locking all firearms in a gun safe or installing gun locks. Some stores that sell guns provide temporary storage as a service; in other cases, a trusted friend or family member will offer to store the guns until the crisis has passed. When a person is going through a crisis, red flag laws in some places allow family members to petition the courts to have firearms temporarily removed and stored elsewhere.

More firearms are involved in suicide than are involved in homicides in the United States. A 1999 study of California and gun mortality found that a person is more likely to die by suicide if they have purchased a firearm, with a measurable increase of suicide by firearm beginning at most a week after the purchase and continuing for six years or more.

The United States has both the highest number of suicides and firearms in circulation in a developed country, and when gun ownership rises so too does suicide involving the use of a firearm. A 2004 report by the National Academy of Sciences found an association between estimated household firearm ownership and gun suicide rates, though a study by two Harvard researchers did not find a statistically significant association between household firearms and gun suicide rates, except in the suicides of children aged 5–14. Another study found that gun prevalence rates were positively associated with suicide rates among people aged 15 to 24, and 65 to 84, but not among those aged 25 to 64. Case-control studies conducted in the United States have consistently shown an association between guns in the home and increased suicide risk, especially for loaded guns in the home. Numerous ecological and time series studies have also shown a positive association between gun ownership rates and suicide rates. This association tends to only exist for firearm-related and overall suicides, not for non-firearm suicides. A 2013 review found that studies consistently found a relationship between gun ownership and gun-related suicides, with few exceptions. A 2016 study found a positive association between gun ownership and both gun-related and overall suicides among men, but not among women; gun ownership was only strongly associated with gun-related suicides among women. During the 1980s and early 1990s, there was a strong upward trend in adolescent suicides with a gun, as well as a sharp overall increase in suicides among those age 75 and over. A 2014 systematic review and meta-analysis found that access to firearms was associated with a higher risk of suicide.

A 2006 study found an accelerated decline in firearm-related suicides in Australia after the introduction of nationwide gun control. The same study found no evidence of substitution to other methods. Multiple studies in Canada found that gun suicides declined after gun control, but other methods rose, leading to no change in the overall rates. Similarly, in New Zealand, gun suicides declined after more legislation, but overall suicide rates did not change; this might be due to the highly stringent firearm storage laws and very low prevalence of handgun ownership in New Zealand. A study about Canada found no significant correlations between provincial firearm ownership and overall provincial suicide rates.

Jumping 

Jumping is the most common method of suicide in Hong Kong, accounting for 52.1% of all reported suicide cases in 2006 and similar rates for the years before that. The Centre for Suicide Research and Prevention of the University of Hong Kong believes that it may be due to the abundance of easily accessible high-rise buildings in Hong Kong. In the United States, jumping is among the least common methods of suicide (less than 2% of all reported suicides in 2005). In a 75-year period to 2012, there were around 1,400 suicides at the Golden Gate Bridge. 

Many jumping deaths could be prevented through the construction of fencing or other safety equipment. For example, suicide by jumping into a volcanic crater is a rare method of suicide. Mount Mihara in Japan briefly became a notorious suicide site during the Great Depression following media reports of a suicide there. Copycat suicides in the ensuing years prompted the erection of a protective fence surrounding the crater.  Similarly, in New Zealand, secure fencing at the Grafton Bridge substantially reduced the rate of suicides.

Constructing barriers is not the only option, and it can be expensive.  Other method-specific prevention actions include making staff members visible in high-risk areas, using closed-circuit television cameras to identify people in inappropriate places or behaving abnormally (e.g., lingering in a place that people normally spend little time in), and installing awnings and soft-looking landscaping, which deters suicide attempts by making the place look ineffective. 

Another factor in reducing jumping deaths is to avoid suggesting in news articles, signs, or other communication that a high-risk place is a common, appropriate, or effective place for dying by jumping from. The efficacy of signage is uncertain, and may depend on whether the wording is simple and appropriate.

Cutting and stabbing 

A fatal self-inflicted wound to the wrist is termed a deep wrist injury, and is often preceded by several tentative surface-breaking attempts known as hesitation wounds, indicating indecision or a self-harm tactic. For every suicide by wrist cutting, there are many more nonfatal attempts, so that the number of actual deaths using this method is very low.

Wounds from suicide attempts involve the non-dominant hand, with damage often done to the median nerve, ulnar nerve, radial artery, palmaris longus muscle, and flexor carpi radialis muscle. Such injuries can severely affect the function of the hand, and the inability caused to carry out work or interests increases the risk of further attempts.

Seppuku is a form of Japanese ritual suicide by disembowelment. It was originally reserved for samurai in their code of honour. It is not often used in the modern day because it is painful and slow.

Drowning 

Suicide by drowning is the act of deliberately submerging oneself in water or other liquid to prevent breathing. It accounts for less than 2% of all suicides in the United States. Of those who attempt suicide by drowning in the US, about half die.

Starvation and dehydration 
A classification has been made of Voluntarily Stopping Eating and Drinking (VSED) which is often resorted to in terminal illness. This includes fasting and dehydration, and has also been referred to as autoeuthanasia.

Fasting to death has been used by Hindu, Buddhist, and Jain ascetics and householders, as a ritual method of suicide known as Prayopavesa in Hinduism; Sokushinbutsu historically in Buddhism; and as Sallekhana in Jainism. Cathars also fasted to death after receiving the consolamentum sacrament, in order to die while in a morally perfect state. This method of death is also associated with the political protest of the hunger strike such as the 1981 Irish hunger strike in which ten prisoners died.

Death from dehydration can take from several days to a few weeks. This means that unlike many other suicide methods, it cannot be accomplished impulsively. Those who die by terminal dehydration typically lapse into unconsciousness before death, and may also experience delirium and deranged serum sodium.

Terminal dehydration has been described as having substantial advantages over physician-assisted suicide with respect to self-determination, access, professional integrity, and social implications. Specifically, a patient has a right to refuse treatment and it would be a personal assault for someone to force water on a patient, but such is not the case if a doctor merely refuses to provide lethal medication. But it also has distinctive drawbacks as a humane means of voluntary death. One survey of hospice nurses found that nearly twice as many had cared for patients who chose voluntary refusal of food and fluids to hasten death as had cared for patients who chose physician-assisted suicide. They also rated fasting and dehydration as causing less suffering and pain and being more peaceful than physician-assisted suicide. Other sources note very painful side effects of dehydration, including seizures, skin cracking and bleeding, blindness, nausea, vomiting, cramping and severe headaches.

Collision with or of a vehicle 
Another suicide method is to lie down, or throw oneself, in the path of a fast-moving vehicle, either on the road or onto railway tracks. Nonfatal attempts may result in profound injuries, such as multiple bone fractures, amputations, concussion and severe mental and physical handicapping.

Road 

Some people use intentional car crashes as a suicide method. This especially applies to single-occupant, single-vehicle wrecks, although some suicidal people cause head-on collisions with heavier vehicles. Even single-vehicle collisions may harm other road users; for example, a driver who brakes abruptly or swerves to avoid a suicidal person may collide with something else on the road, resulting in harm to the driver or others. Both the targeted driver and bystanders may be traumatized by the experience, even if everyone survives.

The real percentage of suicides among motor vehicle fatalities is not reliably known and likely varies by the ease of accessing a car and the ease of accessing other methods. One review article suggested that more than 2% of crashes result from suicidal intent. A study in Switzerland indicated that 1% of deaths by suicide involved a motor vehicle collision.

Rail 

On railway tracks above ground, somebody may simply lie down or stand on the tracks, as the speed of an approaching train prevents its easy stopping. This type of suicide may cause trauma for the train driver.

Data gathered to 2014 showed that there were 3,000 suicides and 800 trespass-related injuries on the European railways each year.

A large number of suicides in Japan every year involve the railway system. Suicide by train is seen as a social problem, especially in the larger cities such as Tokyo or Nagoya, because it disrupts train schedules, damages equipment, harms the drivers, and, if one occurs during the morning rush-hour, causes numerous commuters to arrive late for work. Suicide by train persists despite a common policy among life insurance companies to deny payment to the beneficiary in the event of suicide by train (payment is usually made in the event of most other forms of suicide). Suicides involving the high-speed bullet-train, or Shinkansen are extremely rare, as the tracks are usually inaccessible to the public (i.e. elevated and/or protected by tall fences with barbed wire) and legislation mandates additional fines against the family and next-of-kin of the person who died by suicide. As in Belgium, family members of the person who died by suicide may be expected to cover the cost of rail disruption, which can be significantly extensive. It has been argued this prevents possible suicide, as the person who is considering suicide would want to spare the family not only the trauma of a lost family member but also being sued in court.

The U.S. Federal Railroad Administration reports that there are 300 to 500 suicides by train each year. The agency also reported that those suicides on railway rights-of-ways were by people who tended to live near railroad tracks, were less likely to have access to firearms, and were significantly compromised by both severe mental disorder and substance abuse.

Reduction 

Railway-related suicides are rarely impulsive, and this view has led to research on behaviour analysis using CCTV at known hotspots. Some behaviour patterns are implicated such as station-hopping, platform switching, standing away from others, letting a number of trains go by, and standing close to where trains enter. Surveillance cameras are viewable by railway staff. Media reporting has been linked to increased rail suicide attempts.

Public access to rail tracks may be restricted by the erection of fences. Fencing on both sides of the rail lines are carried out. Other preventive measures are landscaping to create tree and bush hedging as a natural fencing, and the installation of prohibitive signage. Fencing and landscaping have shown significant reductions in suicide attempts, and signage a lesser reduction. Sometimes vegetation along the tracks can obscure the view of the train driver and the removal of this is also advocated.

The installation of platform screen doors in many stations and countries has significantly decreased the numbers of suicides, notably in Hong Kong. In Japan the use of calming blue lights on station platforms is estimated to have resulted in an 84 per cent reduction in suicide attempts.

On the London Underground the presence of a platform drainage pit has been shown to halve the number of deaths from suicide attempts.

Air 

Toward the end of the 20th century, one or two pilots in the US died by suicide by aircraft each year. The pilot was usually flying alone at the time, and was using alcohol or drugs about half the time. In the rare case of a pilot engaging in murder–suicide, the number of innocent people is sometimes very high. On 24 March 2015, a Germanwings co-pilot deliberately crashed Germanwings Flight 9525 into the French Alps to kill himself, killing 150 people with him. Suicide by pilot has also been proposed as a potential cause for the disappearance and following destruction of Malaysian Airlines Flight 370 in 2014, with supporting evidence being found in a flight simulator application used by the flight's pilot.

Disease 

There have been documented cases of gay men deliberately trying to contract a disease such as HIV/AIDS as a means of suicide.

Electrocution 

Suicide by electrocution involves using a lethal electric shock, and is a rarely used method. This causes arrhythmias of the heart, meaning that the heart does not contract in synchrony between the different chambers, essentially causing elimination of blood flow. Furthermore, depending on the current, burns may also occur. In his opinion outlawing the electric chair as a method of execution, Justice William M. Connolly of the Nebraska Supreme Court stated that "electrocution inflicts intense pain and agonizing suffering", adding that it is "unnecessarily cruel in its purposeless infliction of physical violence and mutilation of the prisoner’s body."

Fire 

Self-immolation is suicide usually by fire. This method of suicide is rare due to its being long and painful. If the attempt is intervened, severe burns and scar tissue will prevail with subsequent emotional impact. It has been used as a protest tactic, by Thích Quảng Đức in 1963 to protest the South Vietnam's anti-Buddhist policies; by Malachi Ritscher in 2006 to protest the United States' involvement in the Iraq War; by Mohamed Bouazizi in 2011 in Tunisia which gave rise to the Tunisian Revolution; and historically as a ritual known as sati where a Hindu widow would immolate herself in her husband's funeral pyre.

Hypothermia 
Hypothermia is a rare method of suicide. Between 1991 and 2014 in the United States, there were eight cases in the scientific literature, and they usually involved some other factor like drugs.

Assisted suicide

Indirect 
Indirect suicide is the act of setting out on an obviously fatal course without directly carrying out the act upon oneself. Indirect suicide is differentiated from legally defined suicide by the fact that the person does not directly cause the action meant to kill them, but rather expects and allows the action to happen to them. Examples of indirect suicide include a soldier enlisting in the army with the intention and expectation of being killed in combat, or provoking an armed law enforcement officer into using lethal force against them. The latter is generally called "suicide by cop".

Evidence exists for suicide by capital crime in colonial Australia. Convicts seeking to escape their brutal treatment would murder another individual. This was felt necessary due to a religious taboo against direct suicide. A person completing suicide was believed to be destined for hell, whereas a person committing murder could be absolved of their sins before execution. In its most extreme form, groups of prisoners on the extremely brutal penal colony of Norfolk Island would form suicide lotteries. Prisoners would draw straws with one prisoner murdering another. The remaining participants would witness the crime, and would be sent away to Sydney, as capital trials could not be held on Norfolk Island, thus earning a break from the Island. There is uncertainty as to the extent of suicide lotteries. While surviving contemporary accounts claim that the practice was common, such claims are probably exaggerated.

Rituals

See also
 Advocacy of suicide
 List of suicides from antiquity to the present
 List of suicides in the 21st century
 Sarco device
 Suicide legislation

References

Further reading

 
 
 
 

 
Suicide
Suicide